A chief content officer (CCO) is a corporate executive responsible for the digital media creation and multi-channel publication of the organization's content (text, video, audio, animation, etc.).

The CCO is usually an executive role or senior vice president position, typically reporting to the chief executive officer or the president of the organization.

In a broadcasting organisation, the CCO is generally the highest ranking creative member of the organization. However, the chief content officer position is also common in many other industries, ranging from insurance to video production based on a LinkedIn study.

Responsibilities
Like all other chief officers, the chief content officer is responsible for supervision, coordination, planning and operation in his or her own field of responsibility. The CCO may also lead a company's branding and marketing efforts (as it relates to content), if these areas are not overseen by a chief marketing officer.

References

Broadcasting occupations
Management occupations
C